Pernille S. Andersen (born 6 November 1972) is a former association football player who represented New Zealand at international level.

Andersen made her Football Ferns debut in a 1–4 loss to Germany on 26 May 1998, and finished her international career with seven caps and 15 goals to her credit, including back to back double hat-tricks as New Zealand demolished Samoa 21–0 and Fiji 14–0.

Aarhus-born Andersen, known as "Skalle", played club football in Denmark for Rolsted, B1913, B1919, OB Odense and HEI and represented the Danish national teams at youth level. She also had a spell in England with Millwall Lionesses before arriving in New Zealand in 1995.

References

External links
Danish Football Union (DBU) statistics

1972 births
Living people
Danish emigrants to New Zealand
New Zealand women's association footballers
New Zealand women's international footballers
Danish women's footballers
Millwall Lionesses L.F.C. players
FA Women's National League players
Footballers from Aarhus
Women's association football forwards